Geoffrey Robert Pope (born 1944) is a Liberal Democrat politician in the United Kingdom.

Career
Pope works as a management consultant in the voluntary sector and was a councillor in the London Borough of Richmond upon Thames, where he was Mayor in 1989–1990 and chair of Social Services. He took his seat on the London Assembly on 6 June 2005 replacing Lynne Featherstone who stepped down in order to concentrate on her work as a newly elected MP. Pope lost his seat at the 2008 election.

In May 2006, he became chair of the London Assembly's Transport Committee. Pope also sat on the Assembly's Health Committee and was a member of the London Fire and Emergency Planning Authority.

References
Who's Who 2008, (A. & C. Black, 2007)

External links
Geoff Pope biography from the London Assembly 
Geoff Pope profile at the site of London Liberal Democrats

Councillors in the London Borough of Richmond upon Thames
Liberal Democrats (UK) councillors
Liberal Democrat Members of the London Assembly
1944 births
Living people